The following is a list of people executed in Texas between 1819 and 1849. There were nine known executions during this period. All of the people were executed by hanging.

Executions 1819–1849

See also 
 Capital punishment in the United States

References

1819
19th-century executions by Texas
19th century-related lists